James Tshekedi is a Botswanan former footballer who played as a defender. He played one game for the Botswana national football team in 2003.

External links

Living people
Association football defenders
Botswana footballers
Botswana international footballers
Mochudi Centre Chiefs SC players
Year of birth missing (living people)